Grant Green (June 6, 1935 – January 31, 1979) was an American jazz guitarist and composer.

Recording prolifically for Blue Note Records as both leader and sideman, Green performed in the hard bop, soul jazz, bebop, and Latin-tinged idioms throughout his career. Critics Michael Erlewine and Ron Wynn write, "A severely underrated player during his lifetime, Grant Green is one of the great unsung heroes of jazz guitar ... Green's playing is immediately recognizable – perhaps more than any other guitarist." Critic Dave Hunter described his sound as "lithe, loose, slightly bluesy and righteously groovy". He often performed in an organ trio, a small group featuring a Hammond organ and drummer.

Apart from fellow guitarist Charlie Christian, Green's primary influences were saxophonists, particularly Charlie Parker, and his approach was therefore almost exclusively linear rather than chordal. He thus rarely played rhythm guitar except as a sideman on albums led by other musicians. The simplicity and immediacy of Green's playing, which tended to avoid chromaticism, derived from his early work playing rhythm and blues and, although he achieved a synthesis of this style with bop, he was a highly skilled blues and funk guitarist and returned to this style in his later career.

Biography 
Grant Green was born on June 6, 1935 in St. Louis, Missouri to John and Martha Green. His father was at various times a laborer and a Saint Louis policeman.

Green began studying guitar while he was in primary school. He received some early instruction in guitar playing from his father, who played blues and folk music. He studied for a year with Forrest Alcorn. But he was mostly self-taught, learning from listening to records.

He first performed in a professional setting at the age of 13 as a member of a gospel music ensemble. His influences were Charlie Christian, Charlie Parker, Lester Young, and Jimmy Raney. He first played boogie-woogie before moving on to jazz. His first recordings in St. Louis were with tenor saxophonist Jimmy Forrest for the United label, where Green played alongside drummer Elvin Jones. Green recorded with Jones for several albums in the mid-1960s. In 1959, Lou Donaldson discovered Green playing in a bar in St. Louis and hired him for his touring band. Green moved to New York at some point during 1959–60.

Lou Donaldson introduced Green to Alfred Lion of Blue Note Records. Lion was so impressed that, rather than first using Green as a sideman, as was the usual Blue Note practice, Lion arranged for him to record initially as a group leader. However, due to Green's lack of confidence the initial recording session was only released in 2001 as First Session.

Despite the shelving of his first session, Green's recording relationship with Blue Note was to last, with a few exceptions, throughout the 1960s. From 1961 to 1965, Green made more appearances on Blue Note LPs, as leader or sideman, than anyone else. Green's first issued album as a leader was Grant's First Stand. This was followed in the same year by Green Street and Grantstand. Grant was named best new star in the Down Beat critics' poll, in 1962. He often provided support to the other important musicians on Blue Note, including saxophonists Hank Mobley, Ike Quebec, Stanley Turrentine and organist Larry Young.

Sunday Mornin' , The Latin Bit and Feelin' the Spirit are all loose concept albums, each taking a musical theme or style: gospel, Latin and spirituals respectively. Grant always carried off his more commercial dates with artistic success during this period. Idle Moments (1963), featuring Joe Henderson and Bobby Hutcherson, and Solid (1964), are described by professional jazz critics as two of Green's best recordings.

Many of Grant Green's recordings were not released during his lifetime. These include several albums with pianist Sonny Clark recorded in 1961-1962 included in The Complete Grant Green & Sonny Clark released by Mosaic Records in 1997, and two albums from 1964 (Matador and Solid) that featured McCoy Tyner and Elvin Jones from the John Coltrane Quartet. In 1966 Green left Blue Note and recorded for several other labels, including Verve. From 1967 to 1969 Green was, for the most part, inactive due to personal problems and the effects of heroin addiction. In 1969 Green returned with a new funk-influenced band. His recordings from this period include the commercially successful Green Is Beautiful and the soundtrack to the film The Final Comedown.

Green left Blue Note again in 1974 and the subsequent recordings he made with other labels divide opinion: some consider Green to have been the 'Father of Acid Jazz' (and his late recordings have been sampled by artists including US3, A Tribe Called Quest and Public Enemy), while others have dismissed them (reissue producer Michael Cuscuna wrote in the sleeve notes for the album Matador: "During the 1970s [Green] made some pretty lame records").

Green spent much of 1978 in the hospital and, against the advice of doctors, went back on the road to earn money. While in New York to play an engagement at George Benson's Breezin' Lounge, he collapsed in his car of a heart attack and died on January 31, 1979. He was buried in Greenwood Cemetery in his hometown of St. Louis, Missouri, and was survived by six children, including his son Grant Green Jr., who is also a guitarist. Since Green's death, his reputation has grown and many compilations exist, of both his earlier (post-bop/straight ahead and soul jazz) and later (funkier/dancefloor jazz) periods.

Equipment 
Green used a Gibson ES-330, then a Gibson L7 with a Gibson McCarty pickguard/pickup, an Epiphone Emperor (with the same pickup) and finally had a custom-built D'Aquisto. According to fellow guitarist George Benson, Grant achieved his tone by turning off the bass and treble settings of his amplifier, and maximizing the midrange. This way he could get his signature punchy, biting tone.

Discography

References

External links 

Grant Green discography project
Grant Green discography at Jazzlists
Playing Jazz Guitar in the Style of Grant Green

20th-century American guitarists
American jazz guitarists
African-American jazz guitarists
American male guitarists
Soul-jazz guitarists
Hard bop guitarists
Jazz-funk guitarists
Blue Note Records artists
Muse Records artists
Guitarists from Missouri
1935 births
1979 deaths
Musicians from St. Louis
Jazz musicians from Missouri
20th-century American male musicians
American male jazz musicians
CTI Records artists
African-American guitarists
20th-century African-American musicians